Beales Pond is a small lake located south of the hamlet of Masonville in Delaware County, New York. Beales Pond drains south via East Branch Cold Spring Creek which flows into Cold Spring Creek, which flows into the West Branch Delaware River.

See also
 List of lakes in New York

References 

Lakes of New York (state)
Lakes of Delaware County, New York